For Sentimental Reasons is an album by American singer, songwriter and producer Linda Ronstadt, released in late 1986. The album peaked at #46 on Billboard 200, as well as #3 on the Top Jazz Albums chart.

It was the third consecutive Platinum-certified collaboration between Ronstadt and bandleader/arranger Nelson Riddle and Ronstadt's eleventh million-selling album overall.

History
For Sentimental Reasons was the final installment of the jazz trilogy that Ronstadt recorded with bandleader and arranger Nelson Riddle, who died during the making of this disc. Three of the tracks were conducted by Terry Woodson.  The album's premier single release, "When You Wish Upon a Star", peaked at #32 in Billboard Magazine's Adult Contemporary chart at the end of 1986.  It was assisted by a popular music video. John Kosh designed the album covers for the trilogy of albums Ronstadt recorded with Nelson Riddle.

All tracks also included in the compilation Round Midnight", released on Asylum Records later in 1986.

Reception

In his retrospective Allmusic review, critic Stephen Thomas Erlewine called the album "virtually indistinguishable from its two predecessors—it has the same sweeping arrangements, and her voice remains adequate, if not spectacular."

Track listing

Personnel 
 Linda Ronstadt – vocals
 Don Grolnick – grand piano (1-4, 6-11)
 Bob Mann – guitar (1-6, 8, 10, 11)
 Dennis Budimir – guitar (7, 9)
 Bob Magnusson – bass (1-4, 6, 8, 10, 11)
 Ray Brown – bass (7, 9)
 John Guerin – drums (1-4, 6, 8, 10, 11)
 Louie Bellson – drums (7, 9)
 Plas Johnson – tenor saxophone (4, 6, 10)
 Bud Shank – alto saxophone (8)
 Chauncey Welsch – trombone (2, 3, 11)
 Warren Luening – trumpet (7, 9)
 James SK Wān – bamboo flute (6, 8)
 The Sequoia String Quartet – strings (5)
 Nelson Riddle – all arrangements, conductor (1-6, 10, 11)
 Terry Woodson – conductor (7, 8, 9)
 Mic Bell – backing vocals (8)
 Drake Frye – backing vocals (8)
 Clifford Holland – backing vocals (8)
 Carl Jones – backing vocals (8)
 James Taylor – backing vocals (9)

Production 
 Peter Asher – producer
 George Massenburg – engineer, mixing
 Sharon Rice – assistant engineer
 Edd Kolakowski – piano and guitar technician, production assistant
 Doug Sax – mastering at The Mastering Lab (Hollywood, California).
 John Kosh – art direction, design 
 Ron Larson – art direction, design
 Robert Blakeman – photography 
 Genny Schorr – wardrobe stylist

Charts

Certifications

References

1986 albums
Linda Ronstadt albums
Albums produced by Peter Asher
Elektra Records albums
Albums arranged by Nelson Riddle
Traditional pop albums
Covers albums